An informal independence referendum for Kurdistan Region was held on 30 January 2005, with final results showing the vast majority of votes, 98.98 percent, cast in favour of independence. Conducted by the Kurdistan Referendum Movement alongside the Iraqi parliamentary elections and Kurdistan Region elections of 2005, the referendum asked the people of Kurdistan Region whether they favoured remaining a part of Iraq or were in favour of an independent Kurdistan.

Background
On 22 December 2004, a non-partisan delegation headed by Ardishir Rashidi-Kalhur, president of the Kurdish American Education Society met with Carina Perelli, Head of the U.N. Electoral Assistance Division and staff, at the United Nations Headquarters in New York, to hand over 1,732,535 signatures, which were collected endorsing the call for an independence referendum on the future of Southern Kurdistan.

The referendum was held at the end of the term of the Iraqi Interim Government.

Impact
The referendum did not lead to the independence of Kurdistan because of threats from neighboring countries, but the Kurdistan Region was granted autonomy in the Constitution of Iraq adopted on October 15, 2005.

Results

See also
2017 Kurdistan Region independence referendum

References

Separatism in Iraq
Kurdistan independence movement
Kurdistan
Referendums in Kurdistan Region
Kurdistan
2005 in Iraq